The 2002–03 Austrian Hockey League season was the 73rd season of the Austrian Hockey League, the top level of ice hockey in Austria. Eight teams participated in the league, and the EHC Black Wings Linz won the championship.

Regular season

Playoffs

External links
Austrian Ice Hockey Association

Aus
1
Austrian Hockey League seasons